Parker Hesse (born May 26, 1995) is an American football tight end for the Atlanta Falcons of the National Football League (NFL). He played college football at Iowa.

College career
Hesse was a member of the Iowa Hawkeyes for five seasons, redshirting as a true freshman. He originally practiced as a linebacker during his redshirt year, but was moved to defensive end near the end of the season. He finished his collegiate career with 182 tackles, 14 sacks, 31 tackles for loss and two interceptions in 52 games played.

Professional career

Tennessee Titans
Hesse signed with the Tennessee Titans as an undrafted free agent on May 13, 2019. He was moved to tight end during the preseason and was waived at the end of training camp. He was resigned by the Titans' practice squad, where he spent the rest of the season. Hesse was waived during final roster cuts before being resigned to the Titans' practice squad again during the 2020 season.

Atlanta Falcons
Hesse was signed by the Atlanta Falcons on May 13, 2021. He was waived on October 9, 2021, and re-signed to the practice squad. He was promoted to the active roster on November 18. He was waived on December 6 and re-signed to the practice squad. He was promoted back to the active roster on January 4, 2022.

The Falcons re-signed Hesse on February 23, 2023.

References

External links
Iowa Hawkeyes bio
Atlanta Falcons bio

1995 births
Living people
Players of American football from Iowa
American football tight ends
Iowa Hawkeyes football players
Atlanta Falcons players
Tennessee Titans players
American football linebackers
American football defensive ends